Yozhef Yozhefovich Sabo (born 29 February 1940) is a former Ukrainian football player and football manager. He is of Hungarian background. He is baptized as a Greek-Catholic.

Playing career

Club
Sabo began to play in 1954 for a team of Uzhhorod bread factory and his first coach was Zoltan Gyorfi. Later until August 1957 he was playing as a forward for Khimik Kalush in competitions among KFK of the Ukrainian SSR. From September 1957 to May 1959 Sabo played in Class B (second tier) for Spartak Uzhhorod.

Sabo made his name as a player at Dynamo Kyiv, appearing at the club from June 1959 to 1969. A four-time Soviet Top League champion, Sabo appeared in 317 games in the competition, scoring 51 goals. His first game he played in a friendly against Tottenham Hotspur F.C. on 1 June 1959. In July 1963 Sabo was disqualified for a year for a rough play, but in February 1964 it was changed to a conditional disqualification. Also in 1968 he was disqualified again for refusing to play for the Soviet national football team.

Sabo was a member of Dynamo Kyiv when the club in 1961 for the first time gained the Soviet title, breaking the Muscovite spell. To the Kyiv's team he arrived along with two other Uzhhorod players Andriy Havasi and Vasyl Turianchyk.

International
Aside from being named one of the 33 best players in the USSR for five years, Sabo capped 76 times for the USSR national side, scoring 16 goals. He played in 41 official matches and 35 friendlies. Sabo made his international debut in away game against Greece on 3 October 1965 (see 1966 FIFA World Cup qualification – UEFA Group 7). Sabo mentioned that the game took place after in Greece took place the Apostasia of 1965 (Royal Coup). While his official first appearance for the Soviet team was in 1965, Sabo was on the 1962 Soviet team roster for the 1962 FIFA World Cup.

Coaching career
However, Sabo became most famous for his coaching, coaching various sides in the late 70s (such as Zorya Luhansk in 1977 and Dnipro Dnipropetrovsk in 1978–1979), he has coached Dynamo Kyiv numerous times (from 1993 to 1997 and 2004–2005, with breaks in between). He is also arguably the second-most successful coach of the Ukraine national team, compiling 16 wins and 12 draws in 34 matches as coach of the side in 1994 and 1996–1999. On 20 September 2007 he was appointed as Dynamo Kyiv's manager after Anatoliy Demyanenko resigned. However, Sabo resigned in early November that year due to personal health problems. He left Dynamo Kyiv by the end of 2007 and has no longer been involved with the club since that time.

Personal life
Sabo was born on a leap year on 29 February.

Sabo has his house near Verecke Pass (Carpathians) where he lives with his wife.

In a 2005 interview, he also said that always wanted to coach the Hungary national football team, but the Hungarian Football Federation leaders never gave him a concrete offer.

At night from 2 onto 3 October 2007 Sabo had a heart attack due to which he was immediately taken to hospital. Doctors managed to save him, but he was prohibited to work due to a weak heart.

In a 2015 interview, Sabo stated that the away game against Benfica in the 1991–92 European Cup that Dynamo lost 0–5 was fixed.

He also mentioned that in Moscow he was called fascist, because there knew that his father served in the Royal Hungarian Army during the World War II and later for that, he was exiled to Siberia. Russian language Sabo started to learn after arriving to Kyiv and with a help of a tutor. Sabo was offered to join Komsomol and Communist Party but declined to explain that he cannot be communist and stay religious. Even after arriving in Kyiv he continued to attend an underground Greek-Catholic service that was taken place in Sviatoshyn.

Sabo said that he became the only Ukrainian who received the medal from the 1966 FIFA World Cup, while at the same time Valeriy Porkujan who also played at the Mundial was left without it. When the Soviets beat Hungary in the quarterfinals, Sabo was forced to hear all kinds of sentiments from his former compatriots. Sabo also explained that the reason why he refused to travel to Hungary with the Soviet Union national team for the quarter-final game was that he tried to finish his journalist degree in Kyiv University. The Soviet team then qualified and without Sabo, but he was disqualified.

In 1970 after a short stint in Luhansk, Sabo for a couple of months was working as a sports correspondent of Ukrainian newspaper "Pravda Ukrainy".

In 1960 when Dynamo was playing an away friendly against FC Bayern Munich, Sabo said that he was approached by Bayern's goalie Árpád Fazekas who offered him to remain in Munich.

Honours

Player
Dynamo Kyiv
Soviet Top League: 1961, 1966, 1967, 1968
Soviet Cup: 1964, 1965–66

Dynamo Moscow
European Cup Winners' Cup runner-up: 1971–72

Manager
Dynamo Kyiv
 Vyshcha Liha: 1993–94, 1994–95, 1995–96, 1996–97
Ukrainian Cup: 1995–96, 2004–05

Orders
 Order of Merit, a full cavalier of the order
 3rd degree (15 October 1999)
 2nd degree (12 October 2004)
 1st degree (1 December 2011)

References

External links
  Verbytsky, I. Yozhef Sabo: In Moscow I was constantly called fascist. UA-Football. 4 March 2015.
  Collection of articles and biography at the RussiaTeam

1940 births
Living people
Sportspeople from Uzhhorod
Soviet people of Hungarian descent
Soviet footballers
Soviet Top League players
Soviet First League players
FC Kalush players
FC Dynamo Kyiv players
FC Dynamo Moscow players
FC Hoverla Uzhhorod players
FC Zorya Luhansk players
1962 FIFA World Cup players
1966 FIFA World Cup players
Olympic footballers of the Soviet Union
Footballers at the 1972 Summer Olympics
Olympic bronze medalists for the Soviet Union
Soviet football managers
Soviet Union international footballers
FC Zorya Luhansk managers
FC CSKA Kyiv managers
FC Dnipro managers
FC Dynamo Kyiv managers
Soviet Top League managers
Soviet First League managers
Soviet Second League managers
Ukrainian Premier League managers
Olympic medalists in football
Ukraine national football team managers
Ukrainian people of Hungarian descent
Hungarian Eastern Catholics
Medalists at the 1972 Summer Olympics
Ukrainian football managers
Association football midfielders